Small form factor (often abbreviated "SFF") is a term for computer components designed to a smaller than usual form factor.

The term is commonly used for:

 Small form factor (desktop and motherboard), desktop computers and motherboards with smaller than ATX form factor, including micro ATX ("μATX"), and micro/nano/pico ITX
 NVMe, storage device connectors such as SFF-8639 (also known as U.2) and SFF-TA-1001 (also known as U.3)
 Serial Attached SCSI (SAS), storage device connectors such as SFF-8482, SFF-8484, SFF-8087, SFF-8643, SFF-8470, SFF-8088, and SFF-8644
 Networking connectors especially optical fiber connectors, that may be described as small form factor compared to older form factors

See also
 Form factor (disambiguation)
 Small Form Factor Committee
 Small Form Factor Special Interest Group (SFF-SIG)